The Gariep Dam is located in South Africa, near the town of Norvalspont, bordering the Free State and Eastern Cape provinces. Its primary purpose is for irrigation, domestic and industrial use as well as for power generation.

Name
The Gariep Dam, on its commission in 1971, was originally named the Hendrik Verwoerd Dam after Hendrik Verwoerd, the Prime Minister before and after 31 May 1961, when the country changed from the Union of South Africa to the Republic of South Africa. However, after the end of apartheid, the Verwoerd name was considered unsuitable. The name was officially changed to Gariep Dam on 4 October 1996. Gariep is Khoekhoe for "river", the original name of the Orange River.

Location
The dam crest is some 1300 m (4250 ft) above sea level.

Dimensions
The wall is 88 m high and has a crest length of 914 m and contains approximately 1.73 million m³ of concrete. The Gariep Dam is the largest storage reservoir in South Africa. In South African English, 'dam' refers both to the structure and the water volume it retains. The hydro-electrical power station houses four 90 MW generators.

Design type and contractors
The structure is a concrete gravity-arch hybrid dam. This design was chosen as the gorge is too wide for a complete arch so flanking walls form gravity abutments to the central arch.

It was built by Dumez, a French construction company.

Gariep Dam Bridge

Rivers and spruits flowing into the dam
 Orange River
 Caledon River
 Brakspruit
 Broekspruit
 Oudagspruit
 Palmietspruit
 Slykspruit

Water consumption, outflow, derivative usages and diversions

It must be carefully managed by balancing the supply-and-demand of this water resource usage for its derivatives of electricity generation, irrigation(food) and municipal drinking water.

Department of Water - Orange River Basin - Map and flow diagrams

Orange-Fish River Project (Tunnel)

Map (Tunnel & Canals)Illustration - Further details on the Department of Water - Fish-Sundays

 Great Fish River Valley, then via Grassridge Dam, ElandsDrift Wier, Cookhouse Tunnel, De MistKraal Weir into
 Sundays River Valley (Canals and Tunnels Scheme) North-West of Port Elizabeth, then via Darlington Dam, Korhaansdrift Weir, Canal, Scheepersvlakte Balancing Dam, Bulk water Pipeline to
 Port Elizabeth, Nooitgedracht Water Treatment Works, since 1992 with water from the Sundays River Valley

Eskom

Gariep Hydro-Electric power plants, which is remotely controlled from Gauteng
Further Facts and Details

Vanderkloof Dam

Gariep Town

Orange-Fish River Project
At Oviston, on the south bank of the reservoir, is the inlet of the Orange-Fish River Tunnel, allowing water to be diverted to the Great Fish River and most of the Eastern Cape's western parts.

There is trade off in the water usage for electricity and inter-basin transfer for water in other areas like Port Elizabeth
Orange-Fish River Tunnel Basin Transfer Schema construction 1972 (Port Elizabeth) on YouTube

Gallery

See also 

 List of rivers of South Africa
 List of reservoirs and dams in South Africa

References

External links

Videos - Opening | Documentaries | Construction 
 Official Opening of the Orange River Dam in South Africa on YouTube
 Short Documentary on the dam construction and motivations thereof (1 of 3 planned dams) on YouTube
 History of the town Construction on YouTube
 Orange-Fish River Tunnel Basin Transfer Schema Construction 1972 - Technical illustrations & diagrams(Port Elizabeth) on YouTube
 Orange-Fish River Tunnel Basin Transfer Schema Construction - Footage on YouTube
 History of the construction and where it all started, rainfall, diagrams, extra
 Orange River Transfer Scheme to Port Elizabeth Documentary - Nooitgedracht Water Treatment Works on YouTube (Carte Blanche)

Videos - Aerial | Presentation
 Full Flood over gates January 2000 on YouTube
 4K Aerial footage of Dam, bridge, campsite, amenities on YouTube
 4K Aerial footage not in flood on YouTube

Other
Gariep Dam - Roots - Largest in the Country - Construction Posters, Origins and Designs from inside the dam wall
Gariep Hydroelectric Power Station on the Eskom-Website
 

Dams completed in 1971
Energy infrastructure completed in 1971
Dams in South Africa
Hydroelectric power stations in South Africa
Orange River
Irrigation in South Africa
20th-century architecture in South Africa